The 4th Political Committee of the Workers' Party of Korea (WPK), officially the Political Committee of the 4th Central Committee (4th CC), was elected in the immediate aftermath of the 4th WPK Congress on 18 September 1961 by the 4th CC's 1st Plenary Session. 

The 2nd Conference, held on 6 October 1966, established a Standing Committee of the Political Committee (SCPC).

It sat until the 4th Congress when it was replaced by the 5th Political Committee.

Members

1st Plenary Session (1961–66)

2nd Conference (1966–70)

References

Citations

Bibliography
 
 
  

4th Political Committee of the Workers' Party of Korea
1961 establishments in North Korea
1970 disestablishments in North Korea